Ayabaca is a town in the highlands of the Piura Region in northwestern Peru, near the border with Ecuador. It is located in the Ayabaca Province and is capital of that province and Ayabaca District, to the southeast of the Ecuadorian border town of Macará. 

The town is situated in the Andes above the Piura Desert at 2,815 meters above sea level. Its Señor Cautivo festival attracts many followers who come in pilgrimage from several northern zones of Peru and even from Ecuador. It had a population of about 10,000 people in 1975.

References

Populated places in the Piura Region